Vysokovo is a rural locality (a village) in Saryevskoye Rural Settlement, Vyaznikovsky District, Vladimir Oblast, Russia. The population was 3 as of 2010.

Geography 
Vysokovo is located on the Tara River, 32 km west of Vyazniki (the district's administrative centre) by road. Saryeyvo is the nearest rural locality.

References 

Rural localities in Vyaznikovsky District